The Coro Monti Pallidi is an Italian all-men a cappella chorus from Laives (Italy).

History
The choir was founded in Auer, South Tyrol in 1967 by a group of music student, conducted by the maestro Sergio Maccagnan; the first headquarters of the choir was a church in Bronzolo, but very soon they moved to Laives.

In 2005 Paolo Maccagnan, son of Sergio, took over from his father in the conduction of the choir.

The repertoire ranges over from Alpini songs to spirituals, from typical Italian popular/traditional music to sacred music.

Discography
1976 – Quatro cavai che trota
1986 – ...dai Monti Pallidi...
1990 – Coro Monti Pallidi
2004 – Voce da una valle
2006 – Stille Nacht
2007 – 40 anni di musica
2018 – Lis Montes Pàljes

References

External links

Official site

Italian choirs
Musical groups established in 1967
1967 establishments in Italy